Karim Djeriou (born August 20, 1992), better known by his stage name Heuss l'Enfoiré (sounding like "Huss"), is a French rapper of Moroccan descent.

Early life

He was born in Villeneuve-la-Garenne, In a family of Moroccan origins in the Hauts-de-Seine department. He grew in La Sablière quarters of the city and later in Saint-Ouen and Seine-Saint-Denis. At age 20, he moved to Schaerbeek, Brussels, Belgium.

Career

He started rapping in 2014, under the pseudonym Heustleur (sounding like Hustler), signed to Esprit Music record label. In 2015, he released videos, gaining fame, particularly when he was featured with rapper Kofs. He was briefly imprisoned but moved on with rappers Zepek, Soolking and others, engaging in a number of freestyles with stories of the banlieues.

In 2017, rapper Sofiane invited him to the show Rentre dans le Cercle alongside more established acts like Sinik, Bigflo & Oli gaining further fame. He also appeared on Sofiane's album Affranchis with the title "IDF" in which he was featured. He remains signed to Sofiane's Affranchis Music record label.

His album En esprit was released in 2019 with the track "Khapta" featuring Sofiane reached number 1 on SNEP the official French Singles Chart. Other collaborations include Soolking, Vald and Koba LaD.

Discography

Albums

Singles

As lead artist

*Did not appear in the official Belgian Ultratop 50 charts, but rather in the bubbling under Ultratip charts.

As featured artist

*Did not appear in the official Belgian Ultratop 50 charts, but rather in the bubbling under Ultratip charts.

Other charted songs

*Did not appear in the official Belgian Ultratop 50 charts, but rather in the bubbling under Ultratip charts.

References

1992 births
Living people
French sportspeople of Algerian descent
French rappers
People from Villeneuve-la-Garenne
Rappers from Hauts-de-Seine
French expatriates in Belgium